At the 1968 Summer Olympics in Mexico City, 36 athletics events were contested, 24 for men and 12 for women. There were a total number of 1031 participating athletes from 93 countries.

These games were notable for a number of Olympic firsts and numerous world records. These included:

Dick Fosbury introduced the Fosbury Flop to the high Jump by jumping over backwards, whereas the prevailing methods involved jumping forwards or sideways.
The first African Gold Medallists in the 1500m and 3000m Steeplechase, as well as many other medals in middle and long distance events. Particularly symbolic of Africa's newfound dominance was the victory by Kenyan athlete Kip Keino in the 1500m final.
Bob Beamon broke Ralph Boston's 1965 and Igor Ter-Ovanesyan's 1967 World Record in the Men's Long Jump by 55 cm (22 in). This record was not broken until 1991.  It remains the second best legal jump in history.
The World Record was broken in the Men's Triple Jump five times by three athletes, including the final jump of the event. The top five finishers all beat the previous world record.
The Black Power salute: Tommie Smith and John Carlos wore black gloves and bowed their heads on the medal podium after their medals in the 200m.
Jim Hines became the first sprinter to officially break the 10-second barrier in the 100 metres.

This was the first Olympics to use an all-weather track surface now used in every major international athletics competition.

Medal summary

Men

Women

Medal table

References

 International Olympic Committee results database
 Athletics Australia

 
1968 Summer Olympics events
O
1968
1968 Olympics